Bawan Singh is an Indian politician and member of the Bharatiya Janata Party. Singh is a 5 time designated senior member of the Uttar Pradesh Legislative Assembly from the Katra Bazar (Assembly constituency) in Gonda district. He is the successor of his father, late 1 time designated senior MLA Shri Ram Singh .

References 

People from Gonda district
Bharatiya Janata Party politicians from Uttar Pradesh
Uttar Pradesh MLAs 2017–2022
Living people
Year of birth missing (living people)
Uttar Pradesh MLAs 2022–2027